Shanelle Workman  is an American actress, producer and director. She is best known for playing the roles of Sarah "Flash" Roberts on the ABC soap opera One Life to Live and Gabriela 'Gaby' Moreno Forester on the CBS soap opera The Bold and the Beautiful. She offers her voice of the character Larxene in the popular video game series, Kingdom Hearts. Currently, Workman lends her voice to "Wendy" in North American commercials for the popular fast food chain Wendy's.

Career
Workman has appeared with fellow soap actress Eden Riegel in the Broadway production of Les Misérables.

In 2005, Workman started filming the movie Jump Shot, where she played a student of Ray Liotta. Workman returned to soaps as Gabriela "Gaby" Moreno Forrester on The Bold and the Beautiful in March 2005 but was let go by the producers of the soap in October 2005 due to storyline purposes and because the character never caught on with viewers.

Workman was the voice actress of Caren Velázquez from the video game Dino Crisis 3, Pasadena O'Possum in Crash Tag Team Racing, Jennifer Willis in Splatterhouse, as well as the leading role as the voice of Milliarde in the GameCube game Baten Kaitos Origins. She also played the role of Larxene in the Kingdom Hearts series, and Alestia Lallis in Mass Effect.

Workman owns Gray Studios LA with her husband, David Barry Gray.

Personal life
On October 3, 2012, Workman became the temporary guardian of her younger sister Ariel Winter, following allegations of Winter's physical and emotional abuse at the hands of their mother Chrisoula. Workman filed a guardianship petition, seeking permanent guardianship over Winter. In her youth, Workman was removed from her mother's care after similar allegations.

In August 2013, Workman's younger brother Jimmy petitioned a court that he be granted custody of his then-15-year-old sister Winter, stating that their other sister, Workman was an "unfit guardian," and a poor role model for Winter. Jimmy, who spoke on behalf of his mother to dispute the accusations that had been leveled at her, lobbied the court for custody by stating that Workman allowed Winter to be publicly "sexualized", that she exploited Winter to promote her acting school, and that she used the money Winter earned as a cast member of the TV series Modern Family to finance "lavish parties and limousines," which Jimmy stated had torn their family apart. Jimmy also told the court that their father, Glenn Workman, who was in charge of Winter's estate, was unfit because his poor financial situation made him vulnerable to manipulation by Workman and her lawyers.

On May 5, 2014, the court ordered permanent guardianship to Workman and removed Winter from her mother's guardianship permanently. In May 2014, a settlement was reached among the parties by which Workman would retain custody of Winter, with Glenn maintaining control of her finances, and making required reports to the court. Superior Court Judge Daniel Murphy would retain jurisdiction over Winter until she turned 18 (January 28, 2016), while Workman and Chrisoula later released a statement stating that they were working toward reconciliation.

Filmography

Film

Television

Video games

References

External links
 
 GrayStudiosLA Website
 Shanelle Workman profile on SoapCentral
 2003 soaptownusa.com interview
 Shanelle Gray Kingdom Hearts Interview

20th-century American actresses
21st-century American actresses
Actresses from Virginia
American child actresses
American film actresses
American soap opera actresses
American television actresses
American voice actresses
American video game actresses
Living people
People from Fairfax, Virginia
Year of birth missing (living people)